Pallacanestro Treviso history and statistics in FIBA Europe and Euroleague Basketball (company) competitions.

European competitions

Worldwide competitions

External links 
FIBA Europe
Euroleague
ULEB
Eurocup

Pallacanestro Treviso